Live in Japan was the first live album released internationally by the American pop music duo Carpenters. The album contained a new version of "Sing" with the children's chorus sung by the Kyoto Children's Choir. The band released "The End of the World" as a promotional single. The album was not released in the U.S., but was widely available as an import.

Track listing

Personnel

Musicians
Richard Carpenter – piano, synthesizer, vocals
Karen Carpenter – vocals, drums
Tony Peluso – guitar, organ, electric bass, synthesizer
Doug Strawn – clarinet, organ, vocals
Danny Woodhams – electric bass, vocals
Bob Messenger – electric bass, flute, tenor saxophone
Cubby O'Brien – drums
Pete Henderson – vocals
Kyoto Children Choir – backing chorus

Production
Richard Carpenter – producer, arranger, orchestrations
Karen Carpenter – co-producer
Kazuo Nagao – engineer
Ray Gerhardt – engineer
Roger Young – engineer

Charts

Weekly charts

Year-end charts

References

1975 live albums
The Carpenters albums
Albums recorded at Festival Hall, Osaka
A&M Records live albums
Universal Music Group live albums